Bothriocephalidae is a family of flatworms belonging to the order Bothriocephalidea.

Genera

Genera:
 Anantrum Overstreet, 1968
 Andycestus Kuchta, Scholz & Bray, 2008
 Bothriocephalus Rudolphi, 1808

References

Cestoda
Platyhelminthes families